Hiroyuki Oshima (born 22 July 1965) is a Japanese bobsledder. He competed in the four man event at the 1994 Winter Olympics.

References

1965 births
Living people
Japanese male bobsledders
Olympic bobsledders of Japan
Bobsledders at the 1994 Winter Olympics
Sportspeople from Tokyo